Jack Gower (born 26 May 1994) is an Irish and British alpine ski racer. He competed for the UK at the 2015 World Championships in Beaver Creek, USA, in the giant slalom. Gower competed for Ireland at the 2022 Winter Olympics.

Career
At the FIS Alpine World Ski Championships 2015 in Beaver Creek, Gower finished 38th in the Giant slalom. Gower made his World Cup debut on 25 November 2017 in the Lake Louise downhill, he finished 67th. On January 2, 2022, it was announced that Gower would start for Ireland in the future. As one of his grandmothers comes from Skibbereen in West Cork, a change of nation was possible.

At the 2022 Winter Olympics in Beijing, Gower competed for Ireland. He finished 12th in the combined event, 31st in downhill and 25th in giant slalom.

World Championship results

References

External links
 Jack Gower Alpine Skiing - olympics.ie
 
 Jack Gower World Cup standings at the International Ski Federation

1994 births
Irish male alpine skiers
Living people
Alpine skiers at the 2022 Winter Olympics
Olympic alpine skiers of Ireland